American University is a university in Washington D.C., United States.

American University may also refer to:

 American University of Afghanistan
 American University of Antigua College of Medicine
 American University of Armenia
 American University of Baghdad
 American University of Bahrain
 American University of Beirut
 American University in Bosnia and Herzegovina
 American University in Bulgaria
 American University in Cairo
 American University of the Caribbean, Sint Maarten
 American University of the Caribbean (Haiti)
 American University of Central Asia, Bishkek, Kyrgyzstan
 American University in Dubai
 American University of Iraq
 American University in Kosovo, former name of RIT Kosovo, an overseas campus of the Rochester Institute of Technology
 American University of Kuwait, Salmiya, Kuwait
 American University in London
 American University of London
 American University of Madaba
 American University of Malta
 American University of the Middle East, Egaila, Kuwait
 American University (Nicaragua)
 American University of Paris
 American University of Phnom Penh
 American University of Puerto Rico
 American University of Rome
 American University of Science and Technology, Beirut, Lebanon
 American University of Sharjah
 American University of Technology, Byblos, Lebanon

See also 
 American College (disambiguation)
 American International University (disambiguation)
 Allied American University
 American Jewish University
 American National University
 American Public University System
 Arab American University
 Girne American University
 Hellenic American University
 Irish American University
 National American University
 Universities in the United States
 List of American institutions of higher education